Tensin-1 is a protein that in humans is encoded by the TNS1 gene.

The protein encoded by this gene localizes to focal adhesions, regions of the plasma membrane where the cell attaches to the extracellular matrix. This protein crosslinks actin filaments and contains a Src homology 2 (SH2) domain, which is often found in molecules involved in signal transduction. This protein is a substrate of calpain II. A second transcript from this gene has been described, but its full length nature has not been determined.

References

External links
 TNS1 Info with links in the Cell Migration Gateway

Further reading